Sokollu Mehmed Pasha Mosque is the name of some 16th-century Ottoman mosques built for grand vizier Sokollu Mehmed Pasha, and may refer to:

 Sokollu Mehmed Pasha Mosque, Azapkapı, (built 1578) in Beyoğlu district of Istanbul, Turkey
 Sokollu Mehmed Pasha Mosque, Büyükçekmece, (built 1567) in Büyükçekmece district of Istanbul Province, Turkey
 Sokollu Mehmed Pasha Mosque, Kadırga, (built 1571) in Fatih district of Istanbul, Turkey
  Sokollu Mehmed Pasha Mosque, Lüleburgaz, (built 1569) in Lüleburgaz district of Kırklareli Province, Turkey

tr:Sokullu Mehmet Paşa Cami